Daniel Anwuli (born 2 May 1997) is a Nigerian chess player. He was awarded the title International Master by FIDE in 2019.

Daniel Anwuli won the 2019 West Africa Chess Championship., qualifying for the Chess World Cup 2019, where he was defeated by Maxime Vachier-Lagrave in the first round. He is the 2020 Nigeria national chess champion.

Anwuli represented Nigeria at the 42nd Chess Olympiad in Baku, Azerbaijan 2016 and at the 43rd Chess Olympiad, Georgia 2018.

References

External links

Daniel Anwuli games at 365Chess.com

1997 births
Living people
Nigerian chess players
Chess International Masters
Chess Olympiad competitors